Cue Club, or International Cue Club is a sports simulation video game developed by Bulldog Interactive and released for Microsoft Windows on 10 November 2000. It is a realistic interpretation of pool and snooker. The game was initially published by Midas Interactive, but since 2012 it has been distributed exclusively by Bulldog through the official Cue Club website.

Gameplay

Cue Club uses a fixed, overhead view of the table, with the user's mouse serving as a controller.

The game features a tournament mode, practice mode, quick game, two-player head-to-head, and a bonus "slam" mode where the balls can be hurled around with the mouse. Different rules are available including eight-ball, nine-ball, speed pool, killer and snooker, with an option to play snooker with either fifteen or ten reds. It's possible to customize the rules for eight-ball to replicate the game's many variants, with further custom rules for killer pool. A large selection of table designs, ball sets and cues are provided, with settings for fast and slow cloth speeds, and different methods to cue.

The game also features a series of themed 'Virtual Chat Rooms' that the player is free to explore, subject to certain conditions. For example, access may be restricted due to overcrowding, or male players may be turned away if it is already occupied by too many men.

Once inside, players interact by sending chat messages and requesting games through a dialogue box. Often the conversation contains banter and joking. If a match is agreed upon, the challengers go off to play. Winners are rewarded with an increase in reputation, allowing them to play higher-ranked opponents and progress through the game's various levels. A loss usually involves a reduction in reputation, making it more difficult to get matches in the future, forcing the player to challenge lower-ranked opponents. When the player attains the maximum 5-star reputation, the 'boss' of the chat room will usually agree to play. By defeating the boss, the player's membership to that room is upgraded from standard to silver, entitling them to certain privileges.

In tournament mode players compete for the eight trophies on offer (one for each chat room). When all eight trophies have been won, the player then competes for the ultimate prize of the Grand Cue Club Trophy, which is the hardest tournament and features all of the bosses. After all of the 'boss' characters have been individually defeated and the Cue Club Tournament has been won, the game is officially completed and an end-game sequence is played. As a further bonus, the winner is awarded a 'gold-card' membership to the chat rooms, which guarantees access and preserves the player's 5-star reputation.

Critical response
Reviews from the gaming press were favourable. Despite embracing a simple top-down view of the table, reviewers often cited the game's accurate physics engine, realistic graphics and high degree of playability as its key strengths. PC Gamer magazine were less impressed, scoring it at 60%, saying, "Despite its other graphical jiggling and poking, that fixed, flat view makes it feel like an 'Internet game'." They did give credit to Bulldog Interactive for the efforts that they put into the game's physics but said that other similar games "are more likely to make you want to put your coins on the table."

Cue Club 2
On 4 July 2014, fourteen years after the original release, Bulldog Interactive released a sequel to the game entitled Cue Club 2. The game was released on the official Cue Club website and Steam.

References

External links
 

Windows games
Windows-only games
Cue sports video games
Snooker video games
2000 video games
Video games developed in the United Kingdom
Single-player video games